Woldmaria is a fungal genus in the family Niaceae. The genus is monotypic, containing the single species Woldmaria filicina, found in Europe and North America. Woldmaria was described by William Bridge Cooke in 1961, with Woldmaria crocea as the type species; it was subsequently moved into synonymy with W. filicina.

See also
 List of Agaricales genera

References

External links
 

Niaceae
Fungi of Europe
Fungi of North America
Monotypic Agaricales genera